The Sanggok Ma clan  is one of the Korean clans. Their Bon-gwan is in Chengde, China. According to the census held in 2015, the number of Sanggok Ma clan clan was 232. Their founder was Ma Gui who worked as general in Ming dynasty. He was dispatched as a member of troop during Japanese invasions of Korea (1592–98). He found Sanggok Ma clan because Ma Sun sang, his great-grandchild, naturalized in Korea.

See also 
 Korean clan names of foreign origin

References

External links 
 

 
Korean clan names of Chinese origin
Ma clans